Wayne Peter Entwistle (born 6 August 1958) is an English former professional footballer who played as a striker. During his career, he made over 300 appearances in the Football League and played for twelve different clubs including three spells with Bury. Owing to his numerous transfers, he is the only person to have played for eight different FA Cup winning clubs.

Career
Having represented England at youth level, Entwistle began his club career with his hometown team Bury in August 1976. After making 31 league appearances, he was sold to Sunderland in November 1977 for £30,000. He went on to make over 50 appearances in all competitions for the club.

He joined Leeds United in October 1979 for a fee of £80,000. Signed as a replacement for Allan Clarke, he struggled to establish himself in the first team and was released on a free transfer a year later. He spent two seasons with Blackpool followed by short spells with Crewe Alexandra and Wimbledon before returning to his first club Bury. After leaving Bury in 1985, he played for Carlisle United, Bolton Wanderers, Burnley and Stockport County.

He returned to Bury for a brief third spell in 1988, playing twice for the club on non-contract terms before leaving to join Wigan Athletic on a permanent basis. Wigan were the eighth FA Cup winning side that Entwistle had played for during his career, the most of any professional player. He played 29 times for the side during the 1988–89 season in the Third Division before leaving to join Hartlepool United at the end of the season. He made his debut for Hartlepool on 9 September 1989 in a 2–1 defeat to Gillingham and appeared in one further match for the club before leaving to join non-league side Halifax Town. He later played for several other non-league sides before retiring.

Later life
Following his retirement from football, Entwistle set up his own meat export business. He has also worked as a DJ.

In 2007, Entwistle submitted a proposed takeover bid at his former club Bury alongside two financial backers. He stated that the possibility of manager Chris Casper being sacked convinced him to become involved but that he had no desire to become chairman if the deal was completed.

References

1958 births
Living people
English footballers
Grays Athletic F.C. players
Bury F.C. players
Sunderland A.F.C. players
Leeds United F.C. players
Blackpool F.C. players
Crewe Alexandra F.C. players
Wimbledon F.C. players
Carlisle United F.C. players
Bolton Wanderers F.C. players
Burnley F.C. players
Stockport County F.C. players
Wigan Athletic F.C. players
Altrincham F.C. players
Hartlepool United F.C. players
Footballers from Bury, Greater Manchester
English Football League players
Association football forwards